The Banate of Bosnia ( / Бановина Босна), or Bosnian Banate (Bosanska banovina / Босанска бановина), was a medieval state based in what is today Bosnia and Herzegovina. Although Hungarian kings viewed Bosnia as part of Hungarian Crown Lands, the Banate of Bosnia was a de facto independent state for most of its existence. It was founded in the mid-12th century and existed until 1377 with interruptions under the Šubić family between 1299 and 1324. In 1377, it was elevated to a kingdom. The greater part of its history was marked by a religiopolitical controversy revolving around the native Christian Bosnian Church condemned as heretical by the dominant Nicene Christian churches, namely the Roman Catholic and Eastern Orthodox, with the Catholic church being particularly antagonistic and persecuting its members through the Hungarians.

Historical background

In 1136, Béla II of Hungary invaded upper Bosnia for the first time and created the title "Ban of Bosnia", initially only as an honorary title for his grown son Ladislaus II of Hungary. During the 12th century, rulers within the Banate of Bosnia acted increasingly autonomously from Hungary and/or Byzantium. In reality, outside powers had little control of the mountainous and somewhat peripheral regions which made up Bosnian Banate.

History

Early history and Kulin 

Ban Borić appears as the first known Bosnian ruler in 1154, as a Hungarian vassal, who participated in the Siege of Braničevo as part of the Hungarian King forces In 1167 he was involved in offensives against the Byzantines when he provided troops for Hungarian armies War ended with the retreat of Hungarian army in Battle of Sirmium, near Belgrade in 1167. Borić's involvement in the war indicates that Bosnia was part of the Hungarian kingdom at that time. The Hungarians sued for peace on Byzantine terms and recognised the empire's control over Bosnia, Dalmatia, Croatia south of the Krka River as well as the Fruška Gora. Bosnia was part of Byzantium from 1167 to 1180, but as Bosnia was distant land, rule over it was probably nominal.

In the time of emperor Manuel I Komnenos death (1180), Bosnia was governed by Ban Kulin who managed to free it from Byzantine influence through the alliance to Hungarian king Béla III, and with help of Serbian ruler Stefan Nemanja and his brother Miroslav of Hum, with whom he successfully waged a war in 1183 against the Byzantines. Kulin secured peace, although it continued as a nominal vassal to Hungarian king. but there is no evidence that Hungarians occupied areas of central Bosnia. 

The Pope emissaries of that time reached to Kulin directly and referred to him as "lord of Bosnia". Kulin was often referred as "veliki ban bosanski" (Great Bosnian Ban) by contemporaries, and by his successor Matej Ninoslav. He had a powerful effect on the development of early Bosnian history, under whose rule an age of peace and prosperity existed.  

In 1189, Ban Kulin issued the first written Bosnian document, now known as the Charter of Ban Kulin, in Bosnian Cyrillic, diplomatic document regarding the trade relations with the city of Ragusa (Dubrovnik). Kulin's rule also marked the start of a controversy involving the indigenous Bosnian Church (a branch of Bogomilism), a Christian sect considered heretical by both the Roman Catholic and Eastern Orthodox Church. Under him, the "Bosnian Age of Peace and Prosperity" would come to exist.

Heresy and Bilino Polje abjuration 
In 1203, Serbian Grand Prince Vukan Nemanjić accused Kulin of heresy and lodged an official appeal to the pope. At Bilino Polje Kulin signed abjuration stating that he was always a faithful Catholic, and saved Banate of Bosnia from outside intervention. In 1203, Kulin moved to defuse the threat of foreign intervention. A synod was held at his instigation on 6 April. Following the Abjuration of Bilino Polje, Kulin succeeded in keeping the Bosnian Diocese under the Ragusan Archdiocese, thus limiting Hungarian influence. The errors abjured by the Bosnian nobility in Bilino Polje seem to have been errors of practice, stemming from ignorance, rather than heretical doctrines. Kulin also reaffirmed his allegiance to Hungary, but despite this, Hungary's authority remained only nominal.  

Andrew II in 1225 gave Bosnia to Pope who expected that king as lord of Bosnia do cleaning of heretics but it is transferred to Archbishop Ugrin Csák Hungarian king's ambitions remained unchanged long after Kulin's death in 1204. Kulin's policy was poorly continued since the Ban's death in 1204 by his son and heir, Stjepan Kulinić, who seems to have remained aligned with the Catholic Church. Stjepan was eventually deposed in 1232.

The Bosnian Church forcibly replaced Kulinić with a nobleman called Matej Ninoslav (1232–50). This caused bad relations with Serbia as the previous ruler was related to the Nemanjić dynasty.. Around this time, a relative of Ninoslav, Prijezda I, converted back to Catholicism (he previously switched to the Bosnian Church for a short period of time). Ninoslav eventually became a protector of the Bosnian Church. In 1234 Hungarian king Andrew II gave the Banate of Bosnia to Duke Coloman. To make matters worse, the legitimate successor for the Bosnian throne of the Kulinić dynasty, count Sibislav of Usora, son of former Ban Stjepan, started to attack Ninoslav positions, attempting to take Banate for himself. Pope Gregory IX replaced the heretical Bosnian bishop in 1235 with John of Wildeshausen, then Master General of the Dominican Order and later declared a saint, and confirmed Duke Coloman as the new legitimate Ban of Bosnia.

Bosnian Crusade 

The Bosnian Crusade led by bishop John and Coloman lasted for five full years. The war only funnelled more support to Ninoslav, as only Sibislav took the Pope's side in the Crusade. Ninoslav issued an edict to the Republic of Ragusa on 22 May 1240, stating that he placed it under his protection in case of an attack by Serbian king Stefan Vladislav. The support from Ragusa was essential to support Matej Ninoslav warfare. The only significant impact the Bosnian Crusade had was augmenting the anti-Hungarian sentiment among the local population, a major factor in politics that contributed to the Ottoman conquest of Bosnia in 1463 and lasted beyond it.

It was also a response due to the very bad relations between Bosnia and Serbia, as Serbia sent no aid to Ninoslav contrary to the traditional alliance. Coloman passed the governorship of Bosnian Banate to Ninoslav distant cousin, Prijezda, who only managed to hold it for two or three years. In 1241, the Tatars invaded Hungary, so Coloman had to fall back from Bosnia. Matej Ninoslav immediately retook control, while Prijezda fled to Hungary in exile. King Bela IV was on the retreat which enabled Ninoslav to restore control over most of Bosnia. The Tatars were fought off by the Croats, sending them back across Bosnia, bringing more destruction to the land. The edict to Ragusa was re-issued in March 1244. Ninoslav was involved in the civil war that erupted in Croatia between Trogir and Split, taking Split's side. King Bela IV of Hungary was greatly frustrated and considered this a conspiracy, so he sent a contingent to Bosnia, but Ninoslav subsequently made peace. In 1248, Ninoslav cunningly saved his lands from yet another papal crusade requested by the Hungarian archbishop.

The remainder of his reign, Ban Ninoslav Matej dealt with inner matters in Bosnia. His death after 1249, possibly in 1250, brought some conflicts over the throne; as the Bosnian Church desired someone from their own sphere of interest, and the Hungarians side desired someone that they could easily control. Eventually, King Bela IV conquered and pacified Bosnia and succeed in putting Ninoslav 's Catholic cousin Prijezda as the Bosnian Ban. Ban Prijezda ruthlessly persecuted the Bosnian Church. In 1254 the Croatian Ban shortly conquered Zahumlje from Serbian king Stefan Uroš I during Hungary's war against Serbia, but peace restored Zahumlje to Serbia.  

Another Hungarian campaign was launched against Bosnia in 1253, but there was no evidence that they reached the Bosnian Banate. However, Hungary did control northern regions of Usora and Soli through their vassal rulers. Bosnian banate continued to exist as de facto independent entity even after Ninoslav.

Kotromanić dynasty 
Prijezda I's realm (founder of Kotromanić dynasty) was significantly smaller than Ninoslav's, the northern regions of Usora and Soli having been detached by the Hungarian crown. In 1284 this contiguous territory was granted to King Ladislaus IV of Hungary's brother-in-law, the deposed Serbian king Dragutin. The same year Prijezda arranged the marriage of his son, Stephen I, with Dragutin's daughter Elizabeth. The marriage had great consequences in the subsequent centuries, when Stephen and Elizabeth's Kotromanić descendants claimed the throne of Serbia. Prijezda was forced to withdraw from the throne in 1287 due to his old age. He spent his last hours on his estate in Zemljenik. 

Hungarians reasserted their authority over territories as Soli, Usora, Vrbas, Sana in the early 13th century. Territory that Ban Prijezda, a loyal Hungarian vassal, controlled was possibly in northern parts of today's Bosnia between rivers Drina and Bosna. Banate of Bosnia to the south remained independent, but we do not know its rulers, successors of ban Ninoslav. 

He was inherited by Prijezda II who ruled independently from 1287–1290, but later together with his brother Stephen I Kotromanić.

Restoration and Expansion 

During the end of the 13th and about the first quarter of the 14th century, till the Battle of Bliska Bosnian banate was under the rule of Croatian bans from Šubić family. After defeat in Battle of Bliska, Mladen II was captured by Charles I who took him to Hungary, which sparked Kotromanić dynasty restoration.  

Stephen II was the Bosnian Ban from 1314, but in reality from 1322 to 1353 together with his brother, Vladislav Kotromanić in 1326–1353. 

By 1326 Ban Stephen II attacked Serbia in a military alliance with the Republic of Ragusa and conquered Zahumlje (or Hum), gaining more of Adriatic Sea coast, from mouth of the Neretva to Konavle, with areas significant Orthodox population under Archbishopric of Ohrid and mixed Orthodox and Catholic population in coastal areas and around Ston. He also expanded into Završje, including the fields of Glamoč, Duvno and Livno. Immediately after the death of Serbian King Stefan Uroš II Milutin in 1321, he had no problem in acquiring his lands of Usora and Soli, which he fully incorporated in 1324.

In 1329, Ban Stephen II Kotromanić pushed another military attempt into Serbia, assaulting Lord Vitomir of Trebinje and Konavle, but the main portion of his force was defeated by the Young King Dušan who commanded the forces of King Stefan Dečanski at Priboj. The Ban's horse was killed in the battle, and he would have lost his life if his vassal Vuk had not given him his own horse. By doing so, Vuk sacrificed his own life, and was killed by the Serbian troops in open battle. Thus the Ban managed to add Nevesinje and Zagorje to his realm.

Throughout his reign in the fourteenth century, Stephen ruled the lands from Sava to the Adriatic and from Cetina to Drina. He doubled the size of his state, and achieved full independence from surrounding countries. Ban Stephen II played Venice and Hungarian kings against each other, slowly ruling more and more independently and soon initiated a conspiracy with some members of the Croatian and Hungarian nobility against his Hungarian liege and father-in-law. 

In 1346 Zadar finally returned to Venice, and the Hungarian King, seeing that he had lost the war, made peace in 1348. Ban of Croatia Mladen II Šubić was greatly opposed to Stephen II's policy, accusing him of treason and the relations between the two Bans worsened ever afterwards. By 1342 the Franciscan Vicariat of Bosnia was established. During the reign of Stjepan II Kotromanić all three churches (Bosnian Church, Orthodox, Catholic) were active in Bosnian Banate.

Tvrtko I reign 

Tvrtko, however, was only about fifteen years old at the time, so his father Vladislav governed as regent. Soon after his accession, Tvrtko traveled with his father throughout the realm, to settle relations with his vassals. Jelena Šubić, Tvrtko's mother, replaced Vladislav as regent upon his death in 1354. She immediately traveled to Hungary to obtain consent to Tvrtko's accession from King Louis I, his overlord. Following her return, Jelena held an assembly (stanak) in Mile, with mother and son confirming the possessions and privileges of the noblemen of "all of Bosnia, Donji Kraji, Zagorje, and the Hum land".

At the start of his personal rule the young Ban somehow considerably increased his power. Although he constantly emphasized his subordinance to the King, Tvrtko started regarding the loyalty of the Donji Kraji noblemen to Louis as treachery against himself. In 1363, a conflict broke out between the two men. By April, the Hungarian King had begun amassing an army An army led by Louis himself attacked Donji Kraji, where the nobility was divided in its loyalties between Tvrtko and Louis. A month later an army led by the Palatine of Hungary Nicholas Kont and the Archbishop of Esztergom Nicholas Apáti struck Usora. Vlatko Vukoslavić deserted to Louis and surrendered to him the important fortress of Ključ, but Vukac Hrvatinić succeeded in defending the Soko Grad fortress in the župa of Pliva, forcing the Hungarians to retreat. In Usora, the Srebrenik Fortress held out against a "massive attack" by the royal army, which suffered the embarrassment of losing the King's seal. The successful defense of Srebrenik marked Tvrtko's first victory against Hungarian king. The unity of the local magnates waned as soon as the Hungarians were defeated, weakening Tvrtko's position and that of a united Bosnia.The anarchy escalated, and in February the following year, the magnates revolted against Tvrtko and dethroned him. He was replaced by his younger brother Vuk, Tvrtko and Jelena took refuge at the Hungarian royal court, where they were welcomed by Tvrtko's former enemy and overlord, King Louis. Tvrtko returned to Bosnia in March and reestablished control over a part of the country by the end of the month, including the areas of Donji Kraji, Rama (where he then resided), Hum, and Usora.

Throughout the following year, Tvrtko forced Vuk southwards, eventually compelling him to flee to Ragusa. Sanko, Vuk's last supporter, submitted to Tvrtko in late summer and was allowed to retain his holdings. Ragusan officials made an effort to procure peace between the feuding brothers, and in 1368, Vuk asked Pope Urban V to intervene with King Louis I on his behalf. Those efforts were futile; but by 1374, Tvrtko had reconciled with Vuk on very generous terms.

The death of Dušan the Mighty and the accession of his son Uroš the Weak, in December 1355, was soon followed by the breakup of the once-powerful and threatening Serbian Empire. It disintegrated into autonomous lordships that, by themselves, could not resist Bosnia. This paved the way for Tvrtko to expand towards the east, but internal problems prevented him from seizing the opportunity immediately.

By the mid-14th century, Bosnian banate reached its peak under young ban Tvrtko Kotromanić who came into power in 1353, and had himself crowned on 26 October 1377.

Economy 

The second Bosnian ruler, Ban Kulin strengthened the country's economy through treaties with Dubrovnik in 1189 and Venice. Charter of Ban Kulin was a trade agreement between Bosnia and the Republic of Ragusa that effectively regulated Ragusan trade rights in Bosnia written on 29 August 1189. It is one of the oldest written state documents in the Balkans and is among the oldest historical documents written in Bosančica.

The export of metal ores and metalwork (mainly silver, copper and lead) formed the backbone of the Bosnian economy, as these goods along others like wax, silver, gold, honey and rawhide were transported over the Dinaric Alps to the seashore by Via Narenta, where they were bought chiefly by the Republics of Ragusa and Venice. Access to Via Narenta was crucial for Bosnian economy, which was possible only after ban Stephen II managed to take control of the trading route during his conquests of Hum. The main trading centres were Fojnica and Podvisoki.

Religion 

Christian missions emanating from Rome and Constantinople started pushing into the Balkans in the 9th century, Christianizing the South Slavs and establishing boundaries between the ecclesiastical jurisdictions of the See of Rome and the See of Constantinople. The East–West Schism then led to the establishment of Roman Catholicism in Croatia and most of Dalmatia, while Eastern Orthodoxy came to prevail in Serbia. Lying in-between, the mountainous Bosnia was nominally under Rome, but Catholicism never became firmly established due to a weak church organization and poor communications. Medieval Bosnia thus remained a "no-man's land between faiths" rather than a meeting ground between the two Churches, leading to a unique religious history and the emergence of an "independent and somewhat heretical church".

While Bosnia remained at least nominally Catholic in the High Middle Ages, the Bishop of Bosnia was a local cleric chosen by Bosnians and then sent to the Archbishop of Ragusa solely for ordination. Although the Papacy already insisted on using Latin as the liturgical language, Bosnian Catholics retained Church Slavonic language. The Franciscans order arrived in Bosnia in the later half of the 13th century, aiming to eradicate the teachings of the Bosnian Church. The first Franciscan vicariate in Bosnia was founded in 1339/40. Stephen II Kotromanić was instrumental in establishing of the vicariate. By 1385. they had four monasteries in Olovo, Mile, Kraljeva Sutjeska and Lašva.

List of rulers

 Ladislaus II of Hungary (1137—1159)
 Ban Borić (1154—1164)
 Ban Kulin (1180—1204)
 Stephen Kulinić (1204—1232)
 Matej Ninoslav (1232—1250)
Prijezda I (1250—1287)
 Prijezda II (1287—1290)
 Stjepan I Kotromanić (1287—1314), together with Prijezda II 1287—1290, as a vassal ban 1290—1314
 Mladen I Šubić of Bribir (1299—1304)
 Mladen II Šubić of Bribir (1304—1322)
 Stjepan II Kotromanić (1314—1353), as vassal ban 1314—1322, independently 1322—1353
 Tvrtko I Kotromanić (1353—1366)
 Vuk Kotromanić (1366—1367)
 Tvrtko I Kotromanić (1367—1377)

References

Sources

 
 
 
 
 
 
 
 
 
 
 
 
 
 

 
Bosnia
12th century in Bosnia
13th century in Bosnia
14th century in Bosnia
States and territories established in 1154
States and territories disestablished in the 1370s
1154 establishments in Europe
1377 disestablishments in Europe
Former countries in the Balkans